Thomas Black may refer to:

Thomas Black (TV personality), Irish television personality
Thomas Jacob Black (known as Jack Black; born 1969), American actor, comedian, singer, and musician
Thomas Reuben Black (1832–1905), Canadian politician
Tom Black (author) (born 1959), American entrepreneur and wine collector
Tom Black (basketball) (born 1941), American basketball player
Tom Black (footballer) (born 1962), Scottish footballer
Tom Black (speedway rider) (born 1940), former motorcycle speedway rider from New Zealand
Tom Campbell Black (1899–1936), English aviator
Tommy Black (footballer, born 1979), English footballer who played for Arsenal and Crystal Palace
Tommy Black (footballer, born 1908) (1908–?), Scottish footballer who played for Arsenal and Plymouth Argyle
Tommy Black (producer), record producer from Sweden